Marhia is a village in West Champaran district in the Indian state of Bihar.

Demographics
As of 2011 India census, Marhia had a population of 4120 in 759 households. Males constitute 52.1% of the population and females 47.8%. Marhia has an average literacy rate of 38.2%, lower than the national average of 74%: male literacy is 57%, and female literacy is 42%. In Marhia, 19.49% of the population is under 6 years of age.

References

Villages in West Champaran district